Cesar's Last Fast is a 2014 American documentary film co-directed and produced by Richard Ray Perez and Lorena Parlee. The film premiered in competition category of U.S. Documentary Competition program at the 2014 Sundance Film Festival on January 19, 2014.

Before the premiere of the film at Sundance Film Festival, Participant Media and Univision News acquired the TV rights of the film. The film will premiere simultaneously in English on Pivot and in Spanish on the Univision Network.

Plot
The film narrates the events of 1988, when Cesar Chavez began his "Fast for Life," a 36-day water-only hunger strike, to draw attention to the horrific effects of unfettered pesticide use on farm workers, their families, and their communities.

Reception
The film received mixed to positive response from critics. Dennis Harvey in his review for Variety said that "While not necessarily the definitive cinematic account of Chavez's life or the UFW movement, Cesar's Last Fast provides a well-crafted, sometimes stirring encapsulation." Justin Lowe of The Hollywood Reporter gave the film positive review and said that "A reverential perspective on America's renowned union founder and leader." Carlos Aguilar from Indiewire in his review said that "Touching, insightful, and extremely well crafted, Richard Ray Perez's work shows above all an admiration for a man whose life wasn't entirely his but of his people."

References

External links
Official website

2014 films
American documentary films
2014 documentary films
Documentary films about labor relations in the United States
Hunger strikes
Toxic effects of pesticides
United Farm Workers
Films about activists
Cesar Chavez
2010s English-language films
2010s American films